WHZT (98.1 FM) is a Rhythmic Contemporary radio station licensed to Williamston, South Carolina, and serving Upstate South Carolina, including Greenville and Spartanburg.  It is owned by SummitMedia and calls itself "HOT 98.1."   The radio studios are at Noma Square in Downtown Greenville.

WHZT has an effective radiated power (ERP) of 100,000 watts.  The transmitter is on North Radio Station Road in Seneca, South Carolina.

History
On  the station signed on as WBFM.  It was a middle of the road and adult standards outlet, airing some of the same programming as sister station WSNW 1150 AM in Seneca, South Carolina. The station continued with the same format until the mid-1990s, even after a power increase to 100,000 watts. The station played oldies for a while and then Triple-A.

Prior to its flip to Rhythmic Top 40 in the spring of 2001, WHZT's previous format was News/Talk/Sports as WPEK ("98.1 The Peak"). WPEK was sold to Cathy Hughes (Radio One) in the fall of 2000 and then sold in late January 2001 to Cox Broadcasting. An agreement was reportedly reached between new station ownership and then affiliate network content provider, Westwood One, which distributed nationally syndicated talk shows to WPEK such as G. Gordon Liddy, Dr. Joy Browne, and the Don & Mike Show, to keep network programming running until February 16, 2001 to facilitate a smoother format transition. However, on February 1, 2001, the Don & Mike Show, which, just 3 days earlier, had again been rated #1 (Arbitron) in the "afternoon drive" time slot, was cut short at 5p.m. after the show's hosts discovered that WPEK had been sold to Cox Broadcasting and began discussing the upcoming format flip on air and taking calls from upset station listeners. New ownership briefly aired national sports talk programming during this interim period, with a flip to Top 40 all-music format still the eventual goal. But in the week prior to the flip it stunted, and in the process kept listeners guessing, with a Modern AC format as "Q98". On April 1, 2001 Q98 became The New Hot 98-1.  The first song was "Party Up" by DMX and continued with 10,000 songs in a row commercial free. Hot 98.1 served as 'companion' to its Adult R&B sister WJMZ-FM, who had been the R&B/Hip-Hop outlet in the region before seguing into their current direction in 2002.

In September 2007, 98.1 "re-launched" with a promotion called "Pay Your Bills" after being "dead" for several days prior, the dead term referring to being "dead serious about giving away free money." This was met with much fanfare on the air as they also launched a freshened image with new voice talent and jingles, the first change of its kind since the station's 2001 launch. The re-launch paid off as WHZT rocketed to the number one position in their highly competitive target demographic, according to the Fall 2007 Arbitron survey. On March 18, 2008 the station announced that "Pay Your Bills" would be returning.

On July 20, 2012, Cox Radio, Inc. announced the sale of WHZT and 22 other stations to SummitMedia LLC for $66.25 million. The sale was consummated on May 3, 2013.

Since the purchase of WHZT by SummitMedia, the station has changed its slogan to "Carolina's Party Station", and continues to report as a Rhythmic Contemporary station.  Its primary competition is CHR WFBC "B93.7" and Urban translator "96.3 The Block", both owned by Audacy

Signal and translator
98.1 WHZT can be heard as far south and west as the northeastern suburbs of the Atlanta metro area, and as far east as the Spartanburg area. In parts of, and specifically east of the Spartanburg area, it becomes more difficult to receive WHZT due to interference from neighboring 97.9 WPEG in Charlotte.  The station had a construction permit in 2006 to move its signal to an antenna closer to the metro in nearby Anderson, South Carolina. To improve its Spartanburg coverage, a translator of Hot 98.1 was added at 94.1 FM (W231BA) in late 2009, located in eastern Spartanburg county on the WRTH tower.  The Hot 98.1 programming is fed via WJMZ's HD2 signal.

Current Airstaff
Mo DeVoe (Maurice DeVoe)(Current PD);
Mornings-VACANT
Middays-Justin Tyme
Afternoons-Ant Dizzle;
Weekends/Swing-Justin Tyme (formerly of WKSE/KISS 98.5 Buffalo);
Mix Shows-DJ Grooves

Former on-air staff
Dex & Barbie T
Fisher,
Taylor Scott,
Murph Dawg,
CJ,
Cap N Lou,
JT/Justin Daly,
Anna,
Kacie,
Kristen, 
Reid,
Jet Black,
Just Jeff,
Jay Styles,
Tone Hollywood,
Brandy,
Johnny D,
Marino,
Eric Sean,
Stevi,
Supa Dave,
Gabe,
Mary K,
Nu York,
Big Julz,
Mike Klein

References

External links
WHZT official website

Contemporary hit radio stations in the United States
HZT
Radio stations established in 1953